Thomas Paul O'Sullivan (born 18 January 1995) is a Welsh professional footballer who plays as a midfielder for  club Gloucester City.

A Wales youth international, he began his professional career with Cardiff City in 2012, making his debut in the League Cup in August 2012. He made his English Football League debut on loan at Port Vale in February 2015. After two loan spells at Newport County during the 2015–16 season, he signed for Colchester United in January 2017. He joined Torquay United on loan for the remainder of the 2017–18 season in January 2018. Having been released by Colchester, he signed with Hereford in October 2018. He spent just under two years with Hereford before making the move to Gloucester City in August 2020.

Club career

Cardiff City
Born in Mountain Ash, Rhondda Cynon Taf, O'Sullivan progressed through the Academy at Cardiff City to sign his first professional contract in 2012. His made his professional debut when he came on as a substitute for Stephen McPhail 19 minutes into a 2–1 League Cup defeat to Northampton Town at Sixfields Stadium on 14 August 2012. He also went on to make an FA Cup appearance on 5 January 2013, as City lost 2–1 to non-League side Macclesfield Town.

O'Sullivan joined League One side Port Vale on a one-month loan on 2 February 2015; manager Rob Page signed O'Sullivan to replace injured creative midfielder Louis Dodds, having been familiar with him from his time as a coach with the Welsh youth teams. He returned to Cardiff on 2 March after only one substitute appearance at Vale Park. Ten days later he was re-signed by Page on another one-month loan, after the departure of Chris Lines created a midfield vacancy in Vale's first team picture. The loan deal was later extended to cover the rest of the 2014–15 season. He made five appearances for the Valiants.

On 5 October 2015, O'Sullivan was named as Welsh Young Player of the Year by the Football Association of Wales. Eight days later he joined Newport County on an initial one-month loan, subsequently extended until 7 January 2016. He made his debut on 17 October in 1–0 home defeat by Portsmouth, and on 24 October, he scored his first professional goal in Newport's 4–1 win at Bristol Rovers. In total he made 13 appearances for the club during the loan spell, which was not extended despite Cardiff manager Russell Slade being encouraged by O'Sullivan's progress. On 10 March 2016, O'Sullivan returned to Newport County on loan until the end of the 2015–16 season. He made a further nine appearances for County during his second spell.

Colchester United
After failing to make an impact on the Cardiff first team during the 2016–17 season, O'Sullivan joined Colchester United on trial in January 2017, completing a transfer to the club for an undisclosed fee on 20 January 2017. He made his debut as a substitute for Drey Wright after 78-minutes of Colchester's 4–0 League Two win at home to Stevenage on 8 April. He made three first-team appearances in 2016–17.

On 4 January 2018, O'Sullivan signed for National League side Torquay United on loan until the end of the season. He made his debut two days later in a 4–0 defeat at Wrexham. He played a total of seven games for Gary Owers's "Gulls", who ended the season being relegated into the National League South. Upon his return to the Colchester Community Stadium at the end of the 2017–18 season he was released by manager John McGreal.

Hereford
On 25 October 2018, O'Sullivan signed with National League North side Hereford after a successful trial period at Edgar Street. He featured 31 times for the "Bulls" over the course of the 2018–19 season. He was re-united with former Cardiff manager Russell Slade in September 2019, following Marc Richards' departure from the club, and O'Sullivan's 96th-minute winner against Gateshead on 17 September secured Slade's first victory at Edgar Street. He scored two goals in 22 appearances in the 2019–20 season, which was permanently suspended on 26 March due to the COVID-19 pandemic in England, with Hereford in 15th-place.

Gloucester City
On 7 August 2020, O'Sullivan joined Hereford's National League North rivals Gloucester City, becoming manager James Rowe's fifth summer signing. He made 21 appearances before the 2020–21 season was curtailed due to the ongoing pandemic. He featured 36 times under Lee Mansell in the 2021–22 season, in what O'Sullivan called "a transitional time" at Meadow Park.

International career
O'Sullivan has represented Wales at under-17, under-19 and under-21 level. He made his competitive debut for the under-17s starting in a 3–2 defeat to Armenia on 17 October 2011. He made five appearances for the under-17 side. On 13 November 2013, he had a goalscoring debut for the under-19 team, featuring as a substitute in Wales' 5–1 defeat to Georgia. He scored six goals in six appearances for the under-19 team. Prior to his under-19 debut, O'Sullivan had already made his under-21 debut, starting in their 4–0 victory over San Marino on 15 October 2013. For his first goals at under-21 level, he scored a brace against Bulgaria during a 3–1 win on 31 March 2015. He scored three goals in 15 competitive under-21 games between 2013 and 2016.

Style of play
O'Sullivan is a creative box-to-box midfielder with a good touch, awareness and technique.

Coaching career
In 2022, he was coaching in the academy at Cardiff City.

Personal life
Tommy's elder brother Sam O'Sullivan played 152 times for Newport County before leaving the club in 2008.

Career statistics

Honours
Individual
Football Association of Wales Young Player of the Year: 2014–15

References

External links

1995 births
Living people
People from Mountain Ash, Wales
Sportspeople from Rhondda Cynon Taf
Welsh footballers
Wales youth international footballers
Wales under-21 international footballers
Association football defenders
Cardiff City F.C. players
Newport County A.F.C. players
Port Vale F.C. players
Colchester United F.C. players
Torquay United F.C. players
Hereford F.C. players
Gloucester City A.F.C. players
English Football League players
National League (English football) players
Cardiff City F.C. non-playing staff